The Antholzer See is a lake in the Antholzertal in South Tyrol, Italy. It belongs to the municipality of Rasen-Antholz.

External links

References 
 Civic Network of South Tyrol 

Lakes of South Tyrol
Rieserferner-Ahrn Nature Park